Anton Bernhardt Julius Lemmer (c. 1871 – 17 September 1957) was a New Zealand music school director and conductor. He was born in Altona, Hamburg, Germany about 1871.

References

1870s births
1957 deaths
New Zealand conductors (music)
Male conductors (music)
People from Altona, Hamburg
New Zealand educators
German emigrants to New Zealand